Rionero may refer to the following comuni in southern Italy:

Rionero Sannitico, in the province of Isernia
Rionero in Vulture, in the province of Potenza